Dong-Pusan College was a private technical college in Busan, a major city in South Korea.  It employed about 65 instructors. In August 2020 Ministry of Education ordered the closure of the university due to its significant financial troubles and corruption of the founders. It is officially closed in the following month.

Academics
The college offers technical instruction in the fields of business, tourism, computers, design, welfare and childhood, and health.

History
The college opened in 1979 as Dongnae Girls' College (동래여자전문대학).  It became coeducational in 1996 and adopted its current name in 1998.

Sister schools

The college maintains international exchange ties with three institutions:  Russia's Novosibirsk Conservatory, Australia's University of Tasmania, and Japan's Beppu University.

See also
List of colleges and universities in South Korea
Education in South Korea

References

Universities and colleges in Busan
1979 establishments in South Korea
Educational institutions established in 1979
Defunct universities and colleges in South Korea